Starflight: The Plane That Couldn't Land (also known as Starflight One or Airport 85) is a 1983 television film (for the ABC Sunday Night Movie) directed by Jerry Jameson and starring Lee Majors, Hal Linden, Lauren Hutton, Ray Milland, Gail Strickland, George DiCenzo, Tess Harper, and Terry Kiser. The film also features an all-star ensemble television cast in supporting roles.

Jameson had become known for his work on "... movie-of-the-week phenomenon and group-jeopardy suspense and terror."  His work with Lee Majors had begun with the television series The Six Million Dollar Man in 1973, with the actor starring in three of Jameson's later films.

Plot
Starflight, the first hypersonic transport, is being prepared for its maiden flight from Los Angeles to Sydney, Australia. On board are the pilot, Cody Briggs, cheating on his wife Janet with Erica Hansen, media-relations representative for Thornwell Aviation. Passengers include designer Josh Gilliam, who is apprehensive about the engines not being under ground control, and satellite TV baron Freddie Barrett. Takeoff is delayed so that the body of the deceased Australian ambassador and his wife, Mrs. Winfield, can be taken aboard; something that Del, the first officer, considers a bad omen.

Bud Culver, Freddie's partner in Australia, tells Freddie he must scrub that day's launch of a TV satellite because weather is closing in; Freddie orders an immediate launch without NASA approval. Cleared by NASA for liftoff, Starflight climbs to 23 miles using its scramjet engines, then levels off. Freddie's rocket runs into trouble with the second stage and has to be destroyed. NASA reports that destruction of the rocket produces debris, heading for Starflight. Cody's lets NASA guide their maneuvers. Engineer Chris Lucas recommends Starflight climb out of danger. Cody engages the rocket engine again, but rocket debris from the failed launch hits the underside of the aircraft. When NASA says they are clear, Cody orders the jets shut off, but they keep firing because the debris has severed the rocket engine controls.

Their hydrogen fuel runs out just as Starflight reaches orbit. NASA dispatches the Columbia Space Shuttle to refuel Starflight, while bringing Josh Gilliam back to Earth to work on the problem. Flight engineer Pete tests the airlock transfer but is killed when the hatch malfunctions and breaks free. Improvising, Cody sends Josh to Columbia inside the ambassador's coffin. Columbia returns to Earth with Josh aboard. He discovers Thornwell's universal docking tunnel, a flexible conduit that could be attached between Starflight and Columbia. Cody has power restored, electrifying the conduit damaged by rocket debris.

Columbia and six astronauts arrive with the tunnel, intending to rescue 20 passengers. Five passengers, including Hal, are successfully brought through. The next five people, including Freddie Barrett, are lost when the flexible tunnel swings too close to the sparking electric line on the damaged underside of the airliner and ignites. Forty-seven passengers remain aboard. Josh is frustrated but an exchange with his wife Nancy reminds him of a fuel tank built by Culver Aviation that can be repurposed to carry people. Columbia with the container and takes 38 more passengers, leaving only nine aboard.

Cody sends electrical engineer Joe Pedowski on EVA to repair the damaged conduit. Josh suggests Starflight follow a shuttle on re-entry, believing the shuttle's heat shield would offer protection. Columbia cannot make a launch in time, but another shuttle, XU-5, in orbit on a military mission, arrives to assist just as Starflight is to hit the atmosphere. The two craft ride in together, and once into the atmosphere, XU-5 veers off, while Cody manages to land Starflight after a harrowing steep descent through the upper atmosphere.

Cast

Production

The film's visual effects were supervised by veteran effects guru John Dykstra's Apogee effects house. Starflight: The Plane That Couldn’t Land made use of stock footage of launches by the space shuttle Columbia and an Apollo-era Saturn V on the launch pad. Columbia makes three launches in 24 hours to help Starflight (something completely impossible given turnaround times for shuttle launches). The Saturn V shown at the Kennedy Space Center was depicted as carrying the communications satellite from a fictitious launch site near Sydney. Each time Columbia lands, the touchdown footage is from the early shuttle days when they landed on the dirt runway at Edwards AFB, rather than the concrete runway that Thornwell would be expected to have. Footage of the approach and landing tests with the shuttle prototype Enterprise was used. A chase plane is also visible.

Strong similarities are seen to the novel Orbit by Thomas Block (1982), whose "Star Streak" aircraft was jet-and-rocket powered and intended for high-atmospheric flight, only to end up in space, but important differences  also are seen. In Orbit, the failure to shut down engines, requiring entry into space lest it burn up, was an act of sabotage rather than accident; the aircraft returns without shuttle assistance "ploughing" the way; and the shuttle mission sent to bring the passengers oxygen fails to launch at all.

Reception
The New York Times said Starflight: The Plane That Couldn’t Land was "... still another reworking of the escapist adventure stuff that proved so popular in the film Airport." A later review by Dave Sindelar noted that the film was a cross between Marooned (1969) and the Airport movies. It also relied heavily on stock NASA footage to its detriment. Also, Starflight: The Plane That Couldn’t Land  was "... slow-moving, mired by disaster-movie style cliches, implausible, and has plenty of dead spots."

Notes

References

Further reading

 Roberts, Jerry. Encyclopedia of Television Film Directors. Lanham, Maryland: Scarecrow Press, 2009. .

External links

Movie trailer

1983 television films
1983 films
1980s disaster films
1980s science fiction films
ABC network original films
American aviation films
American disaster films
American science fiction television films
Disaster television films
Films scored by Lalo Schifrin
Films set on airplanes
Films directed by Jerry Jameson
1980s English-language films
1980s American films